William White Hartzog (September 21, 1941 – October 15, 2020) was a United States Army General whose commands during his 35-year career include the United States Army Training and Doctrine Command, the 1st Infantry Division, and United States Army South. He was born in Wilmington, North Carolina.

Military career
After graduating from The Citadel in 1963, where he received a degree in English, Hartzog was commissioned in the Infantry. His first assignment after the Infantry Officer Basic Course was as Executive Officer of an Officer Candidate School company at Fort Benning, Georgia In 1965 he was assigned to Fort Kobbe, Panama. He deployed to South Vietnam in 1967, eventually commanding a company, and upon return to the United States he attended the Infantry Officer Advanced Course. After graduation, he was assigned as a tactics instructor at the United States Military Academy, then returned to Vietnam in 1972 as a Plans Officer for Military Assistance Command, Vietnam. 

Hartzog attended the United States Marine Corps Command and Staff College from 1973 to 1974, then proceeded to Fort Riley, Kansas where he served in various staff positions with the 1st Infantry Division. In April 1978, he was given command of the 3rd battalion, 5th Infantry, 193rd Infantry Brigade. Following his assignment in Panama, he attended the United States Army War College at Carlisle Barracks, Pennsylvania, and then served at the War Plans Division in Washington D.C., where he eventually became Chief. He was next assigned as Executive Officer at the United States Army Training and Doctrine Command, before taking command of another brigade, the 197th Infantry Brigade at Fort Benning. 

Following promotion to brigadier general, Hartzog served from 1987 to 1989 as the Assistant Commandant of the United States Army Infantry School, then returned to Panama for a third time as the J-3, United States Southern Command, a position he held during Operation Just Cause. He took command of United States Army South in 1990, and followed that command in 1991 with command of the 1st Infantry Division. He served as Deputy Commander in Chief/Chief of Staff, United States Atlantic Command from 1993 to 1994 before taking command of United States Army Training and Doctrine Command at Fort Monroe, Virginia from which he retired in 1998.

Post-military
After retiring from the army, Hartzog became CEO of Burdeshaw Associates, a defense consulting firm, sat on the board of directors of the Army Historical Foundation, and was a member of the Defense Science Board.
He was given the Appalachian State University Distinguished Alumni Award in 1996. He died in Potomac, Maryland on October 15, 2020.

Awards and decorations

References

1941 births
Living people
United States Army generals
Recipients of the Distinguished Service Medal (US Army)
Recipients of the Legion of Merit
United States Army personnel of the Vietnam War
The Citadel, The Military College of South Carolina alumni
Appalachian State University alumni
Recipients of the Soldier's Medal
United States Army War College alumni
Recipients of the Air Medal
Recipients of the Defense Distinguished Service Medal